The following is a list of the television networks and announcers who broadcast college football's Poinsettia Bowl throughout the years.

Television

Radio

References

External links
Bowls: Slight Drop For Poinsettia Bowl

Poinsettia
Broadcasters
Poinsettia Bowl
Poinsettia Bowl
Poinsettia Bowl